Cariba Heine (born 1 October 1988) is a South African-born Australian actress and dancer. She is known for her roles as Rikki Chadwick in the Network Ten show H2O: Just Add Water, Bridget Sanchez in the third series of Blue Water High, and Caroline Byrne in A Model Daughter: The Killing of Caroline Byrne.

Early life
Heine was born in Johannesburg to South African parents Michelle, a former showgirl, and Kevin Heine. She moved to Australia at the age of three with her parents and older brother Kyle (born 1985).

Career

Dancing
Her early days included training in jazz dance, tap dance, classical ballet, acrobatics and rhythmic gymnastics, and studying acting and singing at National Capital Acting School. She danced at her mother's dance school in Canberra, where she later attended Telopea Park School and St Clare's College. She was the youngest dancer to perform at the Stargazers Convention in Sydney, Australia. She was homeschooled to focus on her dance career, and performed in many stage productions, including a tour in the United States, where she featured in the music video for Will Young's song "Leave Right Now". After a serious hip injury, she was suggested to turn temporarily to acting by her manager.

Acting
Heine began her acting career in 2006 by being cast on the television series, H2O: Just Add Water, where she played Rikki Chadwick, one of the lead roles. Heine next portrayed Caroline Byrne in the television film A Model Daughter: The Killing of Caroline Byrne which was broadcast on Network Ten in Australia on 4 November 2009.

In 2011, she joined the cast of the indie film Lord of the Crows, though the film ultimately failed to get crowdfunded. In 2012, she portrayed Heather in Bait 3D, and Delvene Delaney in Channel 9's biographical TV miniseries Howzat! Kerry Packer's War. In 2016, Heine reprised her role as Rikki Chadwick in the final two episodes of the third series of Mako: Island of Secrets, a spin-off of H2O: Just Add Water. The same year Heine had a starring role in the short film How'd I Get in This Field which premiered at the Massachusetts Independent Film Festival.

Heine joined the cast of Home and Away in 2018 as Ebony Harding. In 2020, she appeared in the thriller-drama series The Secrets She Keeps with Laura Carmichael and Jessica De Gouw.

Filmography

References

External links

 

1988 births
21st-century Australian actresses
Australian child actresses
Australian female dancers
Australian people of South African descent
Australian television actresses
Living people
People from Johannesburg
South African emigrants to Australia
South African television actresses
White South African people